Sir Francis Fleming  (31 July 1842 – 4 December 1922) (Chinese: 菲林明) was a British administrator who held appointments in eleven colonies.

The son of James Fleming (1812–1887), Q.C. of Dorset Square and Julia Matilda (1811–1875) daughter of Major John Canning (1775–1824) and niece of Francis Canning (1769–1831) of Foxcote Warwick.

He attended Downside School near Bath, studied law at the Middle Temple, and became a barrister in 1866.

Three years later, from 28 April 1869, he became acting District and Stipendiary Magistrate in Mauritius earning £700 per annum, successively followed by Crown Solicitor (from 15 April 1872), acting District and Stipendiary Magistrate in Savanne (2 November 1872), acting District and Stipendiary Magistrate, and Poor Law Guardian in Flacq (1 March 1873), District and Stipendiary Magistrate in Black River (1 January 1874), and acting District and Stipendiary Magistrate in Moka. Whilst in Mauritius he also went to Seychelles as acting District Judge for four months.

From then held a succession of posts as district judge in Jamaica (1876-1878); Attorney-General of Barbados and acting Chief Justice (from 1878); and acting Chief Justice of St. Lucia.

This was followed in 1880 as private secretary to Sir G. C. Strahan, administering the Government of the Cape, and in 1881, removed to British Guiana as a Puisne Judge from 1882 to 1883.  In 1883 was transferred to Ceylon as a Queen's Advocate, later becoming Attorney-General and acting Chief Justice.

It was December 1886, as he was to be awarded the Order of St Michael and St George, he returned to Mauritius to take up the roles as colonial secretary and administrator (acting governor) from 24 February 1887 to December 1888.

For over a year he was Colonial Secretary of Hong Kong between 1890 and 1892 (years later Fleming Road in Wan Chai, Hong Kong was named after him).

While Governor-in-Chief at Sierra Leone, from 16 May 1892 to January 1894, he witnessed in November 1892 the first systematic strike of the 800 underpaid labouring men of the Royal Engineers' Department in the history of that colony. He wrote that in his opinion the striking workers were "entirely in the right" and that their demands were "wholly justifiable" and "reasonable." He ruled in their favor and raised their pay. The previous governor, John Joseph Crooks, disagreed with Fleming and referred to the raise in pay as a "capitulation." Throughout 1893 there were a number of times in which native leaders from the Mende, Sherbro and Temne communities took their concerns directly to Fleming who proved willing to listen. This reputation largely started with his listening to the striking workers.

Fleming was knighted on 1 January 1892, and in the same year he married Constance Mary Kavanagh (1858–1950), daughter of Maurice Dennis Kavanagh (1821–1899) and Mary Constantia née Clifford (1825–1898) and granddaughter of Hugh Clifford, 7th Baron Clifford of Chudleigh. Their only son, Hugh Joseph (born 26 Jan 1895 in Warwick), became a Sec.-Lieut., and was killed in action during WWI on 24 August 1916 at Nord-Pas-de-Calais, France.

Fleming then took the post as governor of the Leeward Islands from January 1894 where he remained till his retirement in 1901.

Fleming died at the age of 80 at home at 9 Sydney Place, South Kensington, on 4 December 1922. His will was probated the following month; his widow survived him by nearly three decades.

References

External links
  (web image not currently available)

Chief Secretaries of Hong Kong
Governors of the Leeward Islands
1842 births
1922 deaths
Knights Commander of the Order of St Michael and St George
British colonial governors and administrators in the Americas
Attorneys-General of the Colony of Barbados
British Mauritius people
Colony of Jamaica judges
British Guiana judges
Attorneys General of British Ceylon
People from British Hong Kong
Governors of Sierra Leone
British colonial governors and administrators in Africa
British colonial governors and administrators in Asia
19th-century Jamaican judges